Consani is a surname. It is the surname of:
Alessio Consani, bassist for Italian progressive/power metal band Eldritch
Caterina Consani (born 1963), Italian mathematician
Robert Consani, French European Rally Championship driver
Sergio Consani, first husband of American actress and singer Char Fontane
Stéphane Consani, French European Rally Championship driver
Thaigo Consani, contestant in Brazilian reality TV show Are You the One? Brasil
Vincenzo Consani (1818–1888), Italian sculptor